The Handbal Eerste Klasse Nationale Vrouwen is the premier category of the Belgian women's handball national league. Established in 1964, it is currently contested by ten teams. The champion is currently granted a spot in the EHF Cup.

Fémina Visé and Initia Hasselt are the championship's most successful clubs with twelve titles each as of 2019. Initia won ten titles in a row between 1986 and 1996 - and two more in 2015 and 2016 - while Fémina has been the competition's leading team since 1997.

List of champions

 1964  Uilenspiegel Antwerpen
 1965  EV Aalst
 1966  EV Aalst (2)
 1967  Aalst Sportief
 1968  Aalst Sportief (2)
 1969 not held 
 1970 not held
 1971 not held
 1972  Uilenspiegel Antwerpen (2)
 1973  United Tongeren
 1974  Avanti Lebbeke
 1975  Aalst Sportief (3)
 1976  Avanti Lebbeke (2)
 1977  Avanti Lebbeke (3)
 1978  Uilenspiegel Antwerpen (3)
 1979  Uilenspiegel Antwerpen (4)
 1980  United Tongeren (2)
 1981  Uilenspiegel Wilrijk
 1982  United Tongeren (3)
 1983  Avanti Lebbeke (4)

 1984  Avanti Lebbeke (5)
 1985  Sasja Hoboken
 1986  United Tongeren (4)
 1987  Initia Hasselt
 1988  Initia Hasselt (2)
 1989  Initia Hasselt (3)
 1990  Initia Hasselt (4)
 1991  Initia Hasselt (5)
 1992  Initia Hasselt (6)
 1993  Initia Hasselt (7)
 1994  Initia Hasselt (8)
 1995  Initia Hasselt (9)
 1996  Initia Hasselt (10)
 1997  Fémina Visé
 1998  Fémina Visé (2)
 1999  Fémina Visé (3)
 2000  Fémina Visé (4)
 2001  Fémina Visé (5)
 2002  DHC Meeuwen
 2003  DHC Meeuwen (2)

 2004  Fémina Visé (6)
 2005  DHW Antwerpen (5)
 2006  Juventus Melveren
 2007  Fémina Visé (7)
 2008  Fémina Visé (8)
 2009  Fémina Visé (9)
 2010  Fémina Visé (10)
 2011  DHW Antwerpen (6)
 2012  Fémina Visé (11)
 2013  DHW Antwerpen (7)
 2014  Fémina Visé (12)
 2015  Initia Hasselt (11)
 2016  Initia Hasselt (12)
 2017  HB Sint-Truiden
 2018  HB Sint-Truiden (2)
 2019  Achilles Bocholt
 2020
 2021

2011-12 teams
  DHW Antwerpen
  Achilles Bocholt
  HC Eynatten-Raeren
  Fémina Visé
  Initia Hasselt
  DHC Meeuwen
  DHT Middelkerke-Izegem
  Rhino Turnhout
  HB Sint-Truiden
  DHC Waasmunster

References

Women's handball leagues
First Division Handball Women
Women's handball in Belgium
Women's sports leagues in Belgium
Professional sports leagues in Belgium